A list of films produced by the Marathi language film industry based in Maharashtra in the year 1922.

1922 Releases
A list of Marathi films released in 1922.

References

External links
Gomolo - 

Lists of 1922 films by country or language
1922
1922 in Indian cinema